Gerald Coetzee (born 2 October 2000) is a South African cricketer. In December 2017, he was named in South Africa's squad for the 2018 Under-19 Cricket World Cup. In January 2019, he was named in the South Africa national under-19 cricket team's squad, ahead of their tour to India.

Career
Coetzee made his List A debut for Free State in the 2018–19 CSA Provincial One-Day Challenge on 14 October 2018. He made his Twenty20 debut for Knights in the 2018–19 CSA T20 Challenge on 12 April 2019. He made his first-class debut for Knights in the 2019–20 CSA 4-Day Franchise Series on 7 October 2019. In December 2019, he was named in South Africa's squad for the 2020 Under-19 Cricket World Cup. In April 2021, he was named in Free State's squad, ahead of the 2021–22 cricket season in South Africa. On 1 May 2021, he was signed by the Rajasthan Royals as a replacement for Liam Livingstone, during the 2021 Indian Premier League (IPL).

International career
In June 2022, Coetzee was named in South Africa's Twenty20 International (T20I) squad for their tour of England to play the England and Ireland cricket teams.

In February 2023, he was selected in South Africa Test squad for the series against West Indies. He made his Test debut against West Indies on 28 February 2023. In March 2023, he was named in South Africa's One Day International (ODI) squad for their series against West Indies. He made his ODI debut in the second ODI of the series on 18 March 2023 in East London, when he took three wickets.

References

External links
 

2000 births
Living people
Cricketers from Bloemfontein
South African cricketers
Free State cricketers
Knights cricketers
Jozi Stars cricketers